Nausinoe (named after the Greek mythology character Nausinous) is a genus of moths of the family Crambidae. It was first described by Jacob Hübner in 1825.

Species
Nausinoe argyrosticta (Hampson, 1910)
Nausinoe capensis (Walker, 1866)
Nausinoe conchylia Meyrick, 1894
Nausinoe ejectata (Fabricius, 1775)
Nausinoe geometralis (Guenée, 1854)
Nausinoe globulipedalis (Walker, 1866)
Nausinoe gueyraudi Guillermet, 2004
Nausinoe lacustrinalis (Hampson, 1913)
Nausinoe perspectata (Fabricius, 1775)
Nausinoe piabilis (Wallengren, 1876)
Nausinoe pueritia (Cramer, 1780)
Nausinoe quadrinalis (Guenée, 1854)
Nausinoe reussi (Gaede, 1917)
Nausinoe velialis (Gaede, 1917)

Former species
Nausinoe aphrospila Meyrick, 1936

References

Spilomelinae
Crambidae genera
Taxa named by Jacob Hübner